Taron Johnson (born July 27, 1996) is an American football cornerback for the Buffalo Bills of the National Football League (NFL). He played college football at Weber State. He played high school football at Sheldon High School in Sacramento, California.

Early years
Johnson played high school football at Sheldon High School in Sacramento, California. He was pulled up to the school’s varsity squad as a sophomore, one year earlier than the standard, owing to his exceptional talent. He would go on to be the school’s first ever NFL Draft pick.

College career

Coming out of high school, Weber State was the only college that offered Johnson a football position, so he accepted it.

Johnson started five games as a freshman at Weber State, and was a full-time starter thereafter.  As a sophomore, he set a school record with 12 pass break-ups, and then tied the record the following season as a junior.  As a senior in 2017, he totaled three interceptions, nine pass break-ups, and 49 tackles, earning the Big Sky Defensive Player of the Year award and consensus First Time All-American honors.

Professional career 

Johnson was selected by the Buffalo Bills in the fourth round of the 2018 NFL Draft with the 121st overall pick. On May 11, 2018, he signed his rookie contract. Against the Green Bay Packers in week 4, Johnson recorded his first career sack and forced fumble, taking down quarterback Aaron Rodgers with a strip-sack. Johnson recorded his first career interception the following week against the Tennessee Titans, picking off Marcus Mariota in the 13–12 victory. He was placed on injured reserve on December 11, 2018 after undergoing shoulder surgery.

Johnson is currently the Bills' starting nickel cornerback.

In Week 14 against the Pittsburgh Steelers on Sunday Night Football, Johnson intercepted a pass thrown by Ben Roethlisberger and returned it for a 51-yard touchdown during the 26–15 win.

In the Divisional Round of the playoffs against the Baltimore Ravens, Johnson intercepted a pass thrown by Lamar Jackson in the Bills' endzone and returned it for a 101-yard pick six during the 17–3 win. This return tied the longest in NFL playoff history with George Teague.

On October 9, 2021, Johnson signed a three-year, $24 million contract extension with the Bills.

References

External links
Buffalo Bills bio
Weber State Wildcats bio

1996 births
Living people
Players of American football from Sacramento, California
American football cornerbacks
Weber State Wildcats football players
Buffalo Bills players